George Edward Glass  is an American businessman and former diplomat.  He served as the Ambassador of the United States to the Portuguese Republic from 2017 to 2021.

Early life 
George Glass was born in Eugene, Oregon and attended South Eugene High School. He holds a Bachelor of Science degree from the University of Oregon  Glass served as Alumni President at the University of Oregon.

Business career 
George Glass was the Founder, President, and Vice Chairman of Pacific Crest Securities, a technology focused investment bank in Portland, OR, from 1990 to 2014.  After Pacific Crest Securities was purchased by KeyBank, he founded the real estate development firm MGG Development LCC.  Glass has also served as a trustee for the Oregon Health Sciences University and for the University of Oregon.

Ambassador to Portugal 

In 2017, George Glass was nominated by President Donald Trump to become Ambassador Extraordinary and Plenipotentiary of the United States of America to the Republic of Portugal. The United States Senate confirmed his nomination on August 3, 2017. He presented his credentials to the President of the Portuguese Republic, Marcelo Rebelo de Sousa, on August 25, 2017.

During his tenure as Ambassador, Glass has sought to increase economic activity between the United States and Portugal, including on agricultural and energy issues.

Glass has been vocal in criticizing Chinese investments in strategic sectors in Portugal. He has cast aspersions on a proposed takeover by China Three Gorges of the Portuguese energy company EDP. He has also been outspoken about U.S. concerns about the role Huawei might play in future 5G networks in Portugal and elsewhere. In September 2020, in an interview to Expresso about the new 5G technology, Glass stressed that Portugal choose "between its friends and allies and China", hinting at consequences in defense partnerships if Portugal chose to work with China, and further threatened to end the distribution of natural gas through the Port of Sines if the construction of the new terminal were to be delivered to China. An editorial in Público referred to the threat as a diktat and an ultimatum; Foreign Minister Augusto Santos Silva reacted to these remarks by asserting that "in Portugal, the decision-makers are the Portuguese authorities, who decide which are Portugal's interests, within the framework of the Constitution and Portuguese law," and a similar message underscoring national autonomy was issued by President Marcelo Rebelo de Sousa.

In March 2020, he wrote an op-ed in Público about disinformation and the COVID-19 pandemic, in which he accused China of launching a propaganda campaign to try and shift the responsibility of the pandemic to the United States.  

Glass and his wife, Mary, have also been active in supporting Portuguese communities recovering from wildfires and in reforestation. In October 2017, George and Mary visited communities affected by the wildfires of that year in the district of Viseu. In October 2019, they founded the U.S-Portugal Friendship Forest near Leiria and hosted the signing of a sister-park initiative between North Cascades National Park and the Portuguese Peneda-Gerês National Park. 

In September 2019, Glass had named the Ambassador's Residence in Lisbon after former Ambassador and Secretary of Defense Frank Carlucci, who served as Ambassador to Portugal from 1975 to 1978.  

On November 14, 2019, Secretary of State Mike Pompeo presented Glass with the Sue Cobb Award for Exemplary Diplomatic Service.

Glass left his post on January 13, 2021. Shortly before he left the post, he was awarded the Order of Prince Henry the Navigator by President Marcelo Rebelo de Sousa, during a ceremony at Belém Palace.

Honors
 Grand Cross of the Order of Prince Henry the Navigator, Portugal (December 18, 2020).

References

External links
 Profile at Bloomberg 
 Pacific Crest Securities Profile at LinkedIn 
 Visual Curriculum  

Ambassadors of the United States to Portugal
Businesspeople from Eugene, Oregon
Grand Crosses of the Order of Prince Henry
Living people
Trump administration personnel
University of Oregon alumni
Year of birth missing (living people)